Taochuan is a town located in the Taibai County of Baoji, Shaanxi, China.

References

Township-level divisions of Shaanxi